Valia Isabel Barak Pastor (born 11 September 1969) is a Peruvian journalist and television presenter.

Biography
Valia Barak was born in 1969, of Russian-Jewish ancestry by her paternal grandfather. She studied at the Jaime Bausate y Meza School of Journalism at the National University of San Marcos, and graduated with a degree in psychology from Inca Garcilaso de la Vega University on 27 May 2016.

She began her journalism career on Panamericana Televisión. She debuted as a news presenter on the show , which she hosted from 1998 to 2003.

In 2004, Barak moved to Frecuencia Latina as the host of a new Sunday show, Séptimo día. In 2007, she presented the talk show Mujeres de palabra on the same channel.

In 2009, she returned to Panamericana Televisión to host 24 horas, edición central. The following year she hosted the morning news show , and later, 24 horas, edición mediodía.

In 2012, Barak became a contestant on the reality dance series .

Television shows
 Séptimo día (2003–04)
  (2005–2009)
 Mujeres de palabra (2007)
  (1998-2003) (2009–2010)
  (1998–99, 2001, 2010–2011)
 24 horas, edición mediodía (2011–2012)
  (contestant 2012)
 Alto al Crimen (director since 2012)

References

External links
 

1969 births
Living people
National University of San Marcos alumni
People from Lima
Peruvian journalists
Peruvian women journalists
Male journalists
Peruvian people of Russian descent
Peruvian television presenters
Peruvian television journalists
Peruvian radio presenters
Peruvian women radio presenters
Women television journalists
Peruvian women television presenters
Inca Garcilaso de la Vega University alumni